Panegyra stenovalva is a species of moth of the family Tortricidae. It is found in Madagascar.

The wingspan is about 8 mm. The ground colour of the forewings is grey hardly tinged with brownish. The costal area is creamy white without costal dots. The termen has a concolorous slenderer edge. The hindwings are grey.

References

Moths described in 2005
Tortricini
Moths of Africa
Taxa named by Józef Razowski